Thomas Kohnstamm (born ) is an American author from Seattle, Washington.

Fiction

Kohnstamm's novel Lake City was published by Counterpoint Press in January 2019. The dark comedy was called “a caustic satire on class privilege and deprivation” by The Seattle Times and “hip, intrepid, and philosophical” by Publishers Weekly.

Non-fiction

Kohnstamm's book Do Travel Writers Go to Hell?, a gonzo style memoir was published by Random House/Three Rivers Press in April 2008. The author drew criticism, and according to the author, death threats, after he said in publicizing the book that he had performed a "desk update" of a guidebook - before later clarifying that he had only been commissioned to write the front-of-book (introduction, history, culture, etc) chapters and oversee the other writers. He also called into question both the accuracy and the practices of his fellow travel guide writers.

Lonely Planet's publisher Piers Pickard defended their rate of pay, and the accuracy of their work. Other guidebook writers defended some of Kohnstamm's claims, contrasting with those of Pickard who had first claimed "no freebies — period", before then admitting freebies could be taken under some circumstances.

The book received positive reviews. The New York Times observed "were I his editor, I’d want his blood", but also admitted "As a reader...I could not get enough of the most depraved travel book of the year".  Another review praised Kohnstamm's "spirited prose".

Notes

External links 
 Official Site

American travel writers
Bowdoin College alumni
1975 births
Living people